Grand Terrace is a city in San Bernardino County, California, United States. The population was 12,040 at the 2010 census, up from 11,626 at the 2000 census. Grand Terrace is located between Highgrove and Colton, along the I-215 and Agua Mansa industrial corridors. The city is located between two mountain ridges: Blue Mountain to the east and the La Loma Hills to the west.

History

Grand Terrace's roots go back to Mexican land grants dating from the period between 1830 and 1840. Mormon settlers came shortly after, arriving in the San Bernardino Valley, during the 1850s. According to the Riverside Press, in 1876, there were nine buildings in the Terrace-Colton area. Originally, the area was simply referred to as "the Terrace", but the word "Grand" was added around 1898 due to the beautiful views which surround the city. In 1905, Seventh-day Adventists, whose medical university is now located in nearby Loma Linda, settled in the area. Grand Terrace, at the time known as "South Colton", experienced continued growth and development during the Southern California suburbia and sunbelt periods in the late half of the 20th century.

The development of Grand Terrace, or East Riverside, as the Grand Terrace-Highgrove area was called, became a reality with the construction of the Gage Canal. This 22-1/2-mile canal, built at a cost of 2 million dollars, brought water from the Santa Ana River marshlands below The Terrace. With plenty of irrigation water, Grand Terrace rapidly became an agricultural community featuring fine, quality citrus. However, the severe "freeze" of 1913 destroyed many groves. Walnuts, a hardier tree, were planted as replacements along with peaches as a quick-profit crop.

The social activities in the early 1900s centered around the Farm Bureau Extension Service and the Women's Club, followed by the PTA, in the 1930s. Since there were no local churches, people traveled to surrounding communities for worship and other church activities.

In 1962, the Grand Terrace Chamber of Commerce was organized. From the very beginning the Chamber was interested in preserving the local identity of the area, and therefore, was a strong supporter of cityhood. This group did much of the groundwork, which led to the formation of a local governing body in 1976, which was called the Municipal Advisory Council or MAC. After nearly two years of meetings and negotiations with the county, the residents went to the polls to decide the issue of cityhood. The response was an 82% vote for incorporation. On November 30, 1978, the Charter City Council was installed at Terrace Hills Junior High and Grand Terrace officially became the 16th city in San Bernardino County.

Grand Terrace was named one of the "Top 100 Cities to Live In" by Money magazine in 2007.

Overview
Its motto, inscribed on the city flag, is "The Blue Mountain City" (its official slogan is "A city set upon a mountain cannot be hidden"), and refers to the Blue Lupine flower that used to grow on Blue Mountain in the spring.

According to the city's web site, the 2000 census revealed that Grand Terrace has the highest median income in the Inland Empire region at $61,068. According to an article in The Press-Enterprise dated May 31, 2002, "Its clean streets, quiet neighborhoods and no violent crime are big draws for its middle-income population."

Geography
Grand Terrace is located at  (34.031019, -117.316683).

Demographics

2010
The 2010 United States Census reported that Grand Terrace had a population of 12,040. The racial makeup of Grand Terrace was 7,912 (65.7%) White (46.4% Non-Hispanic White), 673 (5.6%) African American, 120 (1.0%) Native American, 778 (6.5%) Asian, 32 (0.3%) Pacific Islander, 1,898 (15.8%) from other races, and 627 (5.2%) from two or more races. Hispanic or Latino of any race were 4,708 persons (39.1%).

The census reported that 11,927 people (99.1% of the population) lived in households, 50 (0.4%) lived in non-institutionalized group quarters, and 63 (0.5%) were institutionalized.

There were 4,403 households, of which 1,548 (35.2%) had children under the age of 18 living in them, 2,214 (50.3%) were opposite-sex married couples living together, 599 (13.6%) had a female householder with no husband present, 254 (5.8%) had a male householder with no wife present. There were 285 (6.5%) unmarried opposite-sex partnerships, and 26 (0.6%) same-sex married couples or partnerships. 1,026 households (23.3%) were made up of individuals, and 395 (9.0%) had someone living alone who was 65 years of age or older. The average household size was 2.71. There were 3,067 families (69.7% of all households); the average family size was 3.20.

2,781 people (23.1% of the population) were under the age of 18, 1,244 people (10.3%) aged 18 to 24, 3,320 people (27.6%) aged 25 to 44, 3,195 people (26.5%) aged 45 to 64, and 1,500 people (12.5%) who were 65 years of age or older. The median age was 36.1 years. For every 100 females, there were 92.9 males. For every 100 females age 18 and over, there were 89.6 males.

The homeowner vacancy rate was 1.7%; the rental vacancy rate was 7.0%. 7,848 people (65.2% of the population) lived in owner-occupied housing units and 4,079 people (33.9%) lived in rental housing units.

According to the 2010 United States Census, Grand Terrace had a median household income of $64,073, with 6.5% of the population living below the federal poverty line.

2000
At the 2000 census, there were 11,626 people, 4,221 households and 3,051 families residing in the city. The racial makeup of the city was 73.8% White, 4.6% African American, 0.7% Native American, 5.6% Asian, 0.3% Pacific Islander, 9.8% from other races, and 5.2% from two or more races. Hispanic or Latino of any race were 25.4% of the population.

There were 4,221 households, of which 35.0% had children under the age of 18 living with them, 54.1% were married couples living together, 13.5% had a female householder with no husband present, and 27.7% were non-families. 21.7% of all households were made up of individuals, and 5.6% had someone living alone who was 65 years of age or older. The average household size was 2.7 and the average family size was 3.6.

26.3% of the population were under the age of 18, 9.0% from 18 to 24, 31.2% from 25 to 44, 22.8% from 45 to 64, and 10.7% who were 65 years of age or older. The median age was 35 years. For every 100 females, there were 89.1 males. For every 100 females age 18 and over, there were 86.6 males.

The median household income was $53,649 and the median family income was $61,068. Males had a median income of $41,417 compared with $30,491 for females. The per capita income for the city was $21,787. About 4.5% of families and 7.4% of the population were below the poverty line, including 9.6% of those under age 18 and 4.5% of those age 65 or over.

Government

Currently the city council consists of Mayor Darcy McNaboe, Sylvia Robles, Douglas Wilson, William Hussey, and Jeff Allen.

The City Manager is Konrad Bolowich.

Rankings
Grand Terrace was named one of the "Top 100 Cities to Live In" by Money magazine in 2007.

Public safety
The City of Grand Terrace contracts with the San Bernardino County Sheriff's Department. The San Bernardino County Fire Department has a fire station on City Center Court.

Education
The Colton Joint Unified School District serves the students of Grand Terrace with Grand Terrace Elementary School, Terrace View Elementary School, Terrace Hills Middle School, and Grand Terrace High School at the Ray Abril Jr. Educational Complex.
The Roman Catholic Diocese of San Bernardino operates the Blessed Junipero Serra House of Formation in Grand Terrace.

Notable Crime
Ramona Dorsey fatally beat her 11-year-old son, Kevin Lee Wilburn, authorities said. The boy died at Loma Linda University Medical Center on Nov. 16, 1991.
On 06/27/1997, Joseph Marquez was found shot to death behind a building off of La Cadena and De Berry Road.
In 2005-2006 the gang Mind Twisted Hustlers (MTH) and their associates, were investigated by the San Bernardino County Sheriff. For operating a criminal ring in the Grand Terrace area responsible for numerous residential and vehicle burglaries, identity theft, fraud, and drug distribution. As a result, many were incarcerated, mostly juveniles. They have since been dismantled.
On 07/06/2009 park manager John Haning and a maintenance man were doing monthly rounds to check on meters inside the Grand Royal Estates on Newport Avenue when they came across the body of 63-year-old Thomas Harker Sr. Sheriff's detectives arrested 28-year-old Thomas Harker Jr., who is suspected of stabbing his 63-year-old father to death behind the mobile home they shared.
On 01/01/2015 Richard Williamson, 48, died in a gun battle outside the Cal Skate Roller Rink. Another security guard and a bystander were also injured. The rink was hosting an all-night New Year's Eve celebration when a suspect was asked to leave. Shortly after, shots were fired in the parking lot just before 2 a.m. The shooting left bullet holes in the building, a parked car and a big rig parked across the street. After an investigation, detectives arrested Ezekiel Isaiah George, 18, of Perris; Topaz Prince Crummie, 20, of San Jacinto; Adrian Gentry, 17, of Adelanto; Laquan Trice, 15, of Perris; and Maurice Lamont Martin, Jr., 17, of Perris.
 
About 1:50 a.m. March 16, 2019, San Bernardino County deputies responded to a silent robbery alarm at Cal Skate Grand Terrace and eventually found victim, Ryan Harsany unconscious inside along with a fire. Harsany was taken to a hospital, where authorities determined he had been shotmultiple times. He died shortly before 7:30 a.m. Tre’elle Potts, 25, of Moreno Valley, was arrested and charged with the murder of Ryan Harsany, 43.  He faces special allegations of arson causing bodily injury and that he used a firearm.

References

External links
 

Cities in San Bernardino County, California
Populated places in San Bernardino County, California
Populated places on the Santa Ana River
Incorporated cities and towns in California